

Events 
 Invention of the metronome by Johann Nepomuk Mälzel
February 27 – Première of Beethoven's Eighth Symphony in Vienna
September 14 – Francis Scott Key, inspired by the sight of the American flag over Fort McHenry, writes the lyrics of "The Star-Spangled Banner".
November – Romani composer János Bihari plays to the court during the Congress of Vienna.

Classical music 
Ludwig van Beethoven
Polonaise in C major, Op. 89
Piano Sonata No. 27 in E minor, Op. 90
Merkenstein, Op. 100
Overture in C major, Op. 115
Elegischer Gesang, Op. 118
Der glorreiche Augenblick, Op. 136 (Cantata)
Germania, WoO 94
Chorus for the Allied Princes, WoO 95
Abschiedsgesang, WoO 102
Des Krieger's Abschied, WoO 143
Merkenstein, WoO 144
Resignation, WoO 149
20 Irish Songs, WoO 153
Johann Ludwig Böhner – Fantaisie and Variations for Clarinet and Orchestra, Op. 21
Luigi Cherubini – String Quartet No.1
Franz Danzi – Horn Sonata, Op. 44
Anton Diabelli – 30 Sehr leichte übungsstücke, Op. 39
Friedrich Ernst Fesca – 3 String Quartets, Op. 1
John Field 
Piano Concerto No.4, H 28
Nocturnes Nos. 1, 2, and 3 for piano
Mauro Giuliani – 6 Variations on 'I bin a Kohlbauern Bub', Op. 49
Johann Nepomuk Hummel 
Serenade No.1, Op. 63
Piano Trio in G major, Op. 65
Serenade No.2, Op. 66
Piano Concerto No.4, Op. 110
6 Polonaises for piano
Franz Krommer – Concerto No.2 for 2 Clarinets, Op.91
Nikolaus von Krufft – Sonata for Horn and Piano
Friedrich Kuhlau – Rondo, WoO 203
Ferdinand Ries 
Symphony No. 2 in C minor, op. 80
Symphony No.5, Op. 112 (premiered Feb. 14 in London)
Sextet, Op. 142
3 Flute Quartets, Op. 145
Sonate sentimentale, Op. 169
Franz Schubert 
String Quartet No.7, D.94
Trost: an Elisa, D.97
Die Betende, D. 102
String Quartet Movement, D. 103
Die Befreier Europas in Paris, D. 104
Mass No.1, D. 105
Wer ist gross?, D.110
String Quartet No.8, D. 112
An Emma, D. 113
Der Geistertanz, D. 116
Gretchen am Spinnrade, D. 118
Schäfers Klagelied, D. 121
Am See, D.124
Symphony No.2, D.125
Ballade, D. 134
Tantum ergo, D. 739
Louis Spohr
Violin Concerto No. 7 in E minor, Op. 38
Das befreite Deutschland (cantata), WoO 64
Carl Maria von Weber – Piano Sonata No.2 in A-flat major, Op. 39
Johann Wilhelm Wilms – Wilhelmus van Nassauwe, Op.37

Opera 
Ludwig van Beethoven – Fidelio (Vienna, 3rd version)
Johann Nepomuk Hummel – Die Eselshaut, S.101
Friedrich Kuhlau – Røverborgen (The Robbers' Castle)
Giovanni Pacini – La ballerina raggiratrice
Gioacchino Rossini 
Il Turco in Italia
Sigismondo, premiered Dec. 26 in Venice.
Franz Schubert – Des Teufels Lustschloss, D.84

Popular music
"Sadak and Kalasrade, or the Waters of Oblivion" by Henry Bishop 
"The Star-Spangled Banner" by Francis Scott Key

Publications 

 Johann Friedrich Wilhelm Koch – Gesanglehre
 Anton Reicha – Traité de mélodie

Births 
January – Heinrich Wilhelm Ernst, violinist and composer (died 1865)
January 26 – Jean-Chrysostome Brauneis II, organist, composer and teacher, the first Canadian to study music in Europe (died 1871)
February 21 
Nicolò Gabrielli, opera composer (died 1891)
Franz Hoffmann, publisher (died 1882)
February 26 – Giuseppe Lillo, opera composer (died 1863)
March 3 – Charles Kensington Salaman, pianist and composer (died 1901)
April 9 – Félix Battanchon, composer and cellist (died 1893)
April 21 – Béni Egressy, composer and librettist (died 1851)
May 1 – Emma Albertazzi, contralto (died 1847)
 May 7 – Henriette Hansen, Norwegian ballerina, singer and actor (died 1892)
 May 9 – John Brougham, lyricist and librettist (died 1880)
May 10 – Stanislas Verroust, oboist and composer (died 1863)
May 12 – Adolf von Henselt, pianist and composer (died 1889)
May 25 – William H. C. Hosmer, lyricist (died 1877)
June 14 – Alexander John Ellis, musicologist (died 1890)
July 2 – Thérèse Wartel, pianist and composer (died 1865)
July 15 – Edward Caswall, hymnist (died 1878)
October 28 – Annette Julie Nicolò-Isouard, composer (died 1876)
 November 6 – Adolphe Sax, inventor of the saxophone (died 1894) 
 December 19 – Robert Campbell, hymnist (died 1868)

Deaths 
January 4 – Johann Georg Jacobi, lyricist and poet (born 1740)
February 3 – Jan Antonín Koželuh, composer (born 1738)
April 12 – Charles Burney, English music historian (born 1726)
April 15 –  Karl Alois, dedicatee and patron (born 1761)
April 30 – Joseph Harris, composer and organist (born 1745)
May 6 – Georg Joseph Vogler, organist, composer and music theorist (born 1749)
June 8 – Friedrich Heinrich Himmel, composer (born 1765)
June 19 – Friedrich Wilhelm Heinrich Benda, musician (born 1745)
June 27 – Johann Friedrich Reichardt, composer and music critic (born 1752)
July 14 – Giovanna Sestini, opera singer (b. ca 174)
July 25 
Charles Dibdin, musician, songwriter, author of A Musical Tour through England (born c. 1745)
Franz Xaver Huber, librettist (born 1755)
August 19 – Angelo Tarchi, opera composer (born c. 1760) 
September 1 – Erik Tulindberg, first Finnish classical composer of note (born 1761)

References 

 
19th century in music
Music by year